In comic books, an intercompany crossover (also called cross-company or company crossover) is a comic or series of comics in which characters, that at the time of publication are the property or licensed property of one publisher, meet characters owned or licensed by another publisher (for example, DC Comics and Marvel Comics collaborating on Superman vs. The Amazing Spider-Man or WildStorm (DC Comics) and Dynamite Entertainment teaming to produce Freddy vs. Jason vs. Ash). These crossovers typically occur in "one-shot" issues or miniseries.

Some crossovers are part of canon, but most are outside of the continuity of a character's regular title or series of stories. They can be a joke, a dream sequence, or even a "what if" scenario (such as Marvel's What If series or  DC's Elseworlds titles).

While Avengers/JLA is considered canon, Marvel/DC crossovers are generally considered non-canonical. They include those where the characters live in alternate universes, as well as those where they share the same Earth. Some fans have posited a separate "Crossover Earth" for these adventures. In the earliest licensed crossovers, shared world crossovers were preferred. This was the approach for early intercompany crossovers, including 1976's Superman vs. the Amazing Spider-Man and 1981's Superman and Spider-Man. A number of other DC/Marvel adventures take place on a "Crossover Earth", but later intercompany crossovers  tend to present the DC and Marvel Universes as alternate realities, bridged when common foes make this desirable, as the interest in overall continuity has become a major part of even crossover comic books.

Characters are often licensed or sold from one company to another, as with DC acquiring such characters of Fawcett Comics, Quality Comics, and Charlton Comics as the original Captain Marvel, Plastic Man and Captain Atom, respectively. In this way, heroes originally published by different companies can become part of the same fictional universe, and interactions between such characters are no longer considered intercompany crossovers.

Although a meeting between a licensed character and a wholly owned character (e.g., between Red Sonja and Spider-Man in the pages of Marvel Team-Up) is technically an intercompany crossover, they are rarely billed as such. Likewise, this is the case when some characters in an ongoing series are owned or to some extent controlled by their creators, as with Doctor Who antagonists the Daleks, who are not owned by the UK television network the BBC, even though the character of the Doctor is.

See also
 Crossover (fiction)
 Cross-licensing
 Crusaders (DC Comics) and Crusaders (Marvel Comics)

References

External links
Crossover Comix Cover Gallery
Grineau, Joel V. "Intercompany Crossovers: When Universes Collide," Comic Book Conundrum.

 
Crossover fiction
Lists of comics
Superhero fiction